Cinergi Pictures Inc. was an American independent film production company founded by Andrew G. Vajna in 1989, after he had sold his interest in his first production company, Carolco International Pictures. The company had a number of major hit films, most notably Tombstone, Die Hard with a Vengeance and Evita. However, the majority of their films lost money. A string of box office bombs – including Renaissance Man, Color of Night, Judge Dredd, The Scarlet Letter, Nixon, Shadow Conspiracy, Deep Rising and An Alan Smithee Film: Burn Hollywood Burn – ultimately did the company in, and it was dissolved on February 27, 1998. Cinergi Pictures' library is now owned by Disney.

Pre-founding 

Andrew G. Vajna, a Hungarian native, launched his career in the entertainment industry with his purchase of motion picture theaters in the Far East. Later, he founded Panasia Films Limited in Hong Kong before forming Carolco with Mario Kassar in 1976. In less than four years, Carolco became one of the top three foreign sales organizations in motion pictures.

In 1982, Vajna and Kassar made their film production debut with the highly successful First Blood, starring Sylvester Stallone. Rambo: First Blood Part II was released in 1985, generating more than $300 million worldwide, making it one of the most profitable films in the history of filmmaking.

Vajna and Kassar were executive producers on such films as Alan Parker's Angel Heart, Rambo III, and Johnny Handsome. Other projects included Music Box, Total Recall, Air America, Mountains of the Moon, Narrow Margin, and Jacob's Ladder.

History 
Cinergi Pictures Entertainment was founded in 1989 after leaving Carolco. Vajna's strategy was to develop long-term relationships with certain talent and to produce a steady supply of two to four event motion pictures per year. Upon forming Cinergi, Vajna established an alliance with The Walt Disney Company for distribution of Cinergi motion pictures in the United States, Canada and Latin America.

Cinergi's first production, Medicine Man starring Oscar-winner Sean Connery, was followed by Super Mario Bros. in co-production with Allied Filmmakers and Lightmotive, Tombstone starring Val Kilmer and Kurt Russell and Renaissance Man starring Danny DeVito. In 1994, Cinergi released Color of Night starring Bruce Willis, Jane March, and Lesley Ann Warren. With the exception of Tombstone, all of those films flopped at the box office.

In 1992, Cinergi was hired to manage Sovereign Pictures' library, producer of Reversal of Fortune. Cinergi went public in 1994 with Vajna converting $33.6 loans to equity. There was another public offering of share in 1995.

In 1995, Cinergi released Die Hard with a Vengeance starring Bruce Willis, Jeremy Irons, and Samuel L. Jackson. To date, the film has grossed over $300 million worldwide. That film was followed by Judge Dredd starring Sylvester Stallone, The Scarlet Letter with Demi Moore, and Oliver Stone's epic Nixon, starring Anthony Hopkins. The last film released was An Alan Smithee Film: Burn Hollywood Burn.

In the early 1990s, Cinergi started up a VFX company, Mass.Illusion, in Massachusetts.

Closing 
The box office and budgets for their films began to fall in late 1996, and Cinergi Pictures eventually closed on February 27, 1998. The company's film Broadway Brawler involving Bruce Willis had abruptly stopped production in March 1997. After a year on consulting, Disney and Cinergi decided to wind down the company. Disney canceled $38 million in production advance owed and 5% of Cinergi shares in exchange for most of the film rights excluding the international rights of Die Hard with a Vengeance, which was acquired by 20th Century Fox, which ironically was bought by Disney.

The company was separately selling its development slate, a special effects facility and the Evita soundtrack. The development slate included Oliver Stone project underwritten in a first-look deal. Shareholders were expected to get between $2 and $2.50 per share back. The company's development projects sold through an auction to Vajna for $4.75 million. In September 1997, Vajna made a bid to purchase the company's stock at $2.30 a share which was considered underwhelming by Wall Street with the company expect to have $3.48 a share in cash or $45 million. The buyout would only cost him $15 million give his and his other own companies' shares in Cinergi. The Evita soundtrack and the Stone project were still not sold.

Vajna had tasked Mass.Illusion former executive producer Michael Van Himbergen and  Roger Davis to sell the VFX company, which had about $1 million in debt, expert staff, likely contract for a film, The Matrix and What Dreams May Come special effects contract worth $7.5 million. Van Himbergen found Manex Group of Ohio to assume the company's debt.

Three years earlier, Kassar's Carolco Pictures had also collapsed; Vajna and Kassar eventually became partners again in 2002 to form C2 Pictures.

In 2003, Vajna bought a videogame company, Games Unlimited, and renamed it Cinergi Interactive. The company went on to acquire four development studios: Black Hole Entertainment, Clever's Games, Artex Entertainment and Digic Pictures before closing in 2007.

Filmography 
In the United States, Buena Vista Pictures through their Touchstone Pictures and Hollywood Pictures imprints distributed Cinergi's movies. Cinergi division Cinergi Productions N.V. Inc. handled distribution of the company's films worldwide, which they farmed out to many independent film distributors around the world, however this excludes the U.S., Canada, Japan, and Australia rights to Die Hard with a Vengeance, a co-production with 20th Century Fox (and which Disney distributed in most international territories until acquiring worldwide rights in 2019 after the merger with Fox).

References 

Entertainment companies established in 1989
Mass media companies established in 1989
Companies disestablished in 1998
Defunct American film studios
Entertainment companies based in California
Companies based in Santa Monica, California
1989 establishments in California
1998 disestablishments in California
Defunct film and television production companies of the United States
Defunct companies based in Greater Los Angeles
Film production companies of the United States
American independent film studios
Walt Disney Studios (division)
The Walt Disney Company subsidiaries